Senator Foster may refer to:

Members of the United States Senate
Addison G. Foster (1837–1917), U.S. Senator from Washington from 1899 to 1905
Dwight Foster (politician, born 1757) (1757–1823), U.S. Senator from Massachusetts from 1800 to 1803
Ephraim H. Foster (1794–1854), U.S. Senator from Tennessee from 1838 to 1839 and from 1843 to 1845
Henry A. Foster (1800–1889), U.S. Senator from New York from 1844 to 1845
Lafayette S. Foster (1806–1880), U.S. Senator from Connecticut from 1855 to 1867
Murphy J. Foster (1849–1921),  U.S. Senator from Louisiana from 1901 to 1913
Theodore Foster (1752–1828), U.S. Senator from Rhode Island from 1790 to 1803

U.S. state senate members
Abiel Foster (1735–1806), New Hampshire State Senate
Bill I. Foster (born 1946), Missouri State Senate
Cassius Gaius Foster (1837–1899), Kansas State Senate
Dan Foster (politician) (born 1948), West Virginia State Senate
David J. Foster (1857–1912), Vermont State Senate
Harry C. Foster (1871–1917), Massachusetts State Senate
Ira Roe Foster (1811–1885), Georgia State Senate and Alabama State Senate
James H. Foster (1827–1907), Wisconsin State Senate
Joseph Foster (politician) (born 1959), New Hampshire State Senate
Joyce Foster (born 1944), Colorado State Senate
Mike Foster (American politician) (born 1930), Louisiana State Senate
Nathaniel Greene Foster (1809–1869), Georgia State Senate
Paulinus Foster (1811–1861), Maine State Senate
Reuben Foster (politician) (1833–1898), Maine State Senate
Robert Coleman Foster (1769–1844), Tennessee State Senate
Stephen Clark Foster (Maine politician) (1799–1872), Maine State Senate
Stephen Clark Foster (1822–1898), California State Senate
Wilder D. Foster (1819–1873), Michigan State Senate
William Foster (New York state senator) (1813–1893), New York State Senate